Tiny Toon Adventures: Wacky Stackers is the first Tiny Toon Adventures video game released on the Nintendo Game Boy Advance. It was released on December 30, 2001 and was developed by Warthog and published by Conspiracy Games. It is also the first puzzle-style game for the franchise. The game features several characters from the television series, including: Buster Bunny, Montana Max, Elmyra Duff, Furrball, Babs Bunny, Plucky Duck, Gogo Dodo and Dizzy Devil.

Gameplay
The player must stack dodo eggs, matching their colors to clear them. Each Tiny Toon has a special ability that may help the player during a game. They can be used if he or she has the necessary amount of coins needed. The player gets coins by cracking open a big egg or doing a combo.

The game features several modes: Survival mode, Puzzle mode with 40 preset puzzles, "1P V Com" mode where players compete against another Tiny Toons character, and Multiplayer mode via the Game Link accessory.

Reception
Game review aggregation website Metacritic gave it 58% based on 5 reviews. IGN gave it a rating of 5/10. French gaming website Jeuxvideo.com gave it 14/20.

References

External links

2001 video games
Falling block puzzle games
Game Boy Advance games
Game Boy Advance-only games
Video games based on Tiny Toon Adventures
Video games developed in the United Kingdom
Conspiracy Entertainment games
Single-player video games